The 1983 West African Nations Cup was the second edition of the tournament. It was held in Ivory Coast between September 25 and October 2. The title was won by Nigeria.

Group stage

Third place play-off

Final

Result

References

External links
1983 West African Nations Cup - Rsssf
Statistics

West African Nations Cup
International association football competitions hosted by Ivory Coast
West
1980s in Ivory Coast
September 1983 sports events in Africa
October 1983 sports events in Africa